Sendra Granite is a plutonic igneous rock population which is part of Delhi supergroup of meta-sedimentary rocks located along NH-8 in Rajasthan, India. It has undergone years of sculpting by wind and air. It was declared as a Geoheritage Site by the Geological Survey of India in 1977.

It is located at a Latitude of -26° 05´ 3.6" N and a Longitude of -74° 13´ 17.8" E and is at a height of 429.6 ± 5.7 m above sea level.

Geography and access 
Sendra Granite is located in the Pali district of Rajasthan in the north-west of India. The Sendra Granite consists of igneous batholiths covering approximately 11 km × 5 km. It is situated near Ajmer district boundary with the nearest town being Beawar at a distance of 15 km. It is surrounded by villages such as Sendra, Shergarh, Chitar, Amarpura, Lalpura, Chang and Khera Sagrotan. It has round the year access by train with the Jaipur – Ahmedabad broad gauge rail line passing along its center. It can be approached from Sendra station or Bar station which is 10 km from Sendra. Pindwara-Ajmer NH-25 also passes through this area. The granite outcrops can be seen on both sides of the rail and roadways.

It is surrounded by Jodhpur in the north-east at a distance of 135 km and Jaipur in the south-west at 195 km.

References 

Plutonic rocks
National Geological Monuments in India